Songs from the Edge is the second album by British musician Dirty Harry (formerly known as Harry).

It was recorded as the follow-up to The Trouble with... Harry (2003) and produced by multi-platinum Grammy-nominated producer Luke Ebbin (Bon Jovi, Rival Schools). The album features Curt Schneider engineering and playing bass guitar, David Levita on guitar, and Victor Indrizzo on drums.

Track listing 
 "Frayed at the Edges"
 "Takes One to Know One"
 "Welcome to What Is Meant to Be"
 "Do You Remember Those Days?"
 "Dirty Boys & Girls"
 "Stepping Stones"
 "Drunks of London Town"
 "Let Go of Me"
 "Fake It Like You"
 "Not That Girl / Been Down"
 "Sweet Sound of Rock'n'roll"

External links 
Harry's Myspace
Harry's Online Community
GirlBand.Org Entry for Dirty Harry

2007 albums
Dirty Harry (musician) albums
Albums produced by Luke Ebbin